International Reptile Rescue, formerly known as Hart's Reptile World, is a not-for-profit reptile rescue organization located in Canby, Oregon, United States. The organization works to rescue all members of the reptile family, including snakes, turtles, tortoises, lizards, alligators and crocodiles. Founded in 1978, the organization also educates the public about reptiles through outreach programs, including offering lectures in educational settings such as libraries, science museums, television appearances and specially arranged birthday parties. 

Under the name of Hart's Reptile World, the organization was often featured in the local Oregon and Washington media, as well as larger media venues. For example, some pythons from the exhibit were featured in the video Sowing the Seeds of Love by Tears for Fears, and Wilbur the Crocodile was featured in the Michael Jackson video "Leave Me Alone."

See also

 Herpetoculture

References

External links 
 Official site
 Michael Jackson's video Leave Me Alone featuring "Wilbur the Crocodile" from Hart's Reptile World (at 1:45)
 Portland Tribune article The blood runs cold: At reptile haven, scales rule and fur is history
 Hart's Reptile World reference in bizjournals article
 Hart's Reptile World founder testifies before Beaverton, Oregon, council regarding the suitability of alligators as pets
 Hart's Reptile World reference on KATU page, under heading "BACK CLOSE TO HOME"
 Oregon Science Teachers Association conference list, within lineup including Hart's Reptile World

Canby, Oregon
Buildings and structures in Clackamas County, Oregon
Education in Clackamas County, Oregon
1978 establishments in Oregon
Wildlife rehabilitation and conservation centers
Environmental organizations based in Oregon
Reptile conservation organizations